The Kansas City Title and Trust Building in Kansas City, Missouri, is a building from 1922. It was listed on the National Register of Historic Places in 2005.

History
The building was designed by the firm Sunderland and Besecke, and built by Mosby-Goodrich Construction Company. Construction of the building began on August 1, 1922.

Architecture and setting
The building is a seven-story structure in the Commercial style. The building is situated on an incline at the corner of Walnut Street and 10th Street in central business district of Kansas City.

The facade is divided into three bays on Walnut Street and seven bays on 10th Street. The structure is built of reinforced concrete with a red-colored brick facade. Cream-colored terra cotta decorates the base.

See also
 National Register of Historic Places listings in Downtown Kansas City, Missouri
 Smith v. Kansas City Title & Trust Co.

References

Bibliography

Buildings and structures in Kansas City, Missouri
Commercial buildings on the National Register of Historic Places in Missouri
Commercial buildings completed in 1922
National Register of Historic Places in Kansas City, Missouri
Chicago school architecture in Missouri